Thione is a genus of beetles in the family Monotomidae, containing the following species:

 Thione australis Kess, 1921
 Thione cephalotes Sharp, 1899
 Thione championi Sharp, 1899
 Thione nigra Kess, 1921
 Thione puncticeps Sharp, 1899

References

Monotomidae
Cucujoidea genera